The 2013 International Champions Cup (or ICC) was an exhibition association football tournament played in the United States and Spain. It began on Saturday, July 27 and culminated on Wednesday, August 7, 2013. This tournament replaced the World Football Challenge and was staged mainly throughout the United States, and with one match in Valencia, Spain. The participating teams were LA Galaxy of the United States, Real Madrid and Valencia of Spain, Milan, Juventus and Inter Milan of Italy, and Chelsea and Everton of England. In the United States, Fox Soccer televised 11 of 12 matches live, and Fox Sports broadcast one match live on August 3. ESPN Deportes televised all matches live on TV and on WatchESPN in Spanish. 

Real Madrid won the tournament, defeating Chelsea 3–1 in the final.

Teams

Venues

Format 
The tournament had two groups of four: an "Eastern" and a "Western" group. The groups were not played as a round-robin; rather, the winners of the first round matches played each other in the second round, and the first round losers also played each other in the second round. The two teams with two wins from the first two matches advanced to the final.  For the other teams, positions in the final round were determined by their position in their group, with the following rules:
 All matches tied at the end of regulation were decided by a penalty shoot-out.
 Three points were awarded for a regulation win, two points for a penalty shoot-out win, one point for a penalty shoot-out loss, and no points for a regulation loss.
 Tiebreakers were: head-to-head, goal difference, number of goals scored.

In other words, though the team placing first (two wins) in each group would be apparent, the determination of second, third (both teams: one win, one loss) and fourth place (two losses) was based on the above tiebreakers.

Bracket

Western Group

Standings

Matches 

 First round

 Second round (First round losers)

 Second round (First round winners)

Eastern Group

Standings

Matches
 First round

 Second round (First round losers)

 Second round (First round winners)

Championship Round

Seventh place match

Fifth place match

Third place match

Final

Final ranking

Top goalscorers

Official song 

The official song of the 2013 International Champions Cup "Exotic" was performed by the Indian Bollywood actress turned singer Priyanka Chopra, and was sung in both English and Hindi.

See also 
 World Football Challenge, an exhibition tournament for mid-season American clubs and pre-season European clubs that was held from 2009 until 2012

References

External links 
 International Champions Cup Official Site

International Champions Cup
2013 in American soccer